Alexa Uifăleanu (23 October 1947 – 17 December 2013) was a Romanian football player and coach who played as a midfielder.

Managerial career 
After retiring from his playing career in 1979 he worked as a coach at the Center for Children and Juniors at Universitatea Cluj until 2001 where he taught and formed generations of players, which include Ioan Sabău, Răzvan Cociș and George Florescu. He also worked as an assistant coach at Universitatea Cluj for a few years.

Death 
In 2001 he suffered a stroke which kept him in bed for the rest of his life.

Honours
Universitatea Cluj
 Divizia B: 1978–79

References

External links
 Alexa Uifăleanu at Labtof.ro

1947 births
2013 deaths
People from Cluj County
Romanian footballers
Association football midfielders
CFR Cluj players
FC Universitatea Cluj players
Liga I players
Liga II players
Romanian football managers
FC Universitatea Cluj managers